Maksim Vladimirovich Paliyenko (born 18 October 1994) is a Russian professional football player. He plays as an attacking midfielder for FC Akron Tolyatti.

Club career
He made his debut in the Russian Premier League on 22 July 2013 for FC Krylia Sovetov Samara in a game against PFC CSKA Moscow.

He played as FC Tosno won the 2017–18 Russian Cup final against FC Avangard Kursk on 9 May 2018 in the Volgograd Arena.

Honours

Club
Tosno
 Russian Cup: 2017–18

Career statistics

External links

References

1994 births
Sportspeople from Samara, Russia
Living people
Russian footballers
Russia under-21 international footballers
Association football midfielders
PFC Krylia Sovetov Samara players
FC Zenit Saint Petersburg players
FC Zenit-2 Saint Petersburg players
FC Tosno players
FC Nizhny Novgorod (2015) players
FC Chayka Peschanokopskoye players
FC Orenburg players
FC Akron Tolyatti players
Russian Premier League players
Russian First League players